The ring-necked francolin (Scleroptila streptophora) is a bird species in the family Phasianidae.  It is found in Burundi, Cameroon, Kenya, Rwanda, Tanzania, and Uganda. Rarer than previously believed, it is uplisted from a species of Least Concern to Near Threatened status in the 2007 IUCN Red List.

References

 BirdLife International (2007): Ring-necked Francolin - BirdLife Species Factsheet. Retrieved 2007-AUG-26.

ring-necked francolin
Birds of Central Africa
Birds of East Africa
ring-necked francolin
Taxonomy articles created by Polbot